MŠK Senec is a Slovak association football club located in Senec. It currently plays in 3. liga (3rd) tier in Slovak football system). The club was founded in 2014 and it had been run only as youth club until Summer 2016, subsequently the senior team of the club was established and begun in 6. liga. These days senior team plays the 3rd highest football competition in Slovakia.

External links
Club profile at Futbalnet portal

References

Football clubs in Slovakia
Association football clubs established in 2014
2014 establishments in Slovakia